Dominik Hrinkow (born 4 August 1988) is an Austrian former racing cyclist, who rode professionally between 2007 and 2019.

Major results

2012
 9th Overall Oberösterreichrundfahrt
2013
 2nd Croatia–Slovenia
2016
 6th Croatia–Slovenia
 9th Overall Tour du Maroc
2018
 4th GP Kranj
 7th V4 Special Series Debrecen - Ibrany
 10th Overall Baltyk–Karkonosze Tour
2019
 1st Stage 2 Tour of Szeklerland

References

External links

1988 births
Living people
Austrian male cyclists
People from Steyr
Sportspeople from Upper Austria